The Sebacinaceae are a family of fungi in the order Sebacinales. Species produce basidiocarps (fruit bodies} that are gelatinous or cartilaginous and variously corticioid, clavarioid, bracket-like, or jelly-like. Microscopically, all have septate basidia and hyphae lacking clamp connections. Many but not all species are mycorrhizal, forming associations with a wide range of plants.

References

Sebacinales
Sebacinaceae
Taxa named by Franz Oberwinkler
Taxa described in 1982